Melville-Saltcoats is a provincial electoral district for the Legislative Assembly of Saskatchewan, Canada. Located in southeastern Saskatchewan, this constituency was created through the Representation Act, 1994 (Saskatchewan) by combining the district of Saltcoats with part of the constituency of Melville.

The largest centre in the riding is the city of Melville (pop. 4,531). Melville is the smallest incorporated city in Saskatchewan. It is also a major transportation hub, with provincial Highways 10, 15, and 47 running through the city – as well as the Canadian National Railway mainline.

Smaller centers in the district include the towns of Langenburg, Esterhazy, Saltcoats and Churchbridge; and the villages of Calder, Grayson, Spy Hill, Neudorf and Stockholm.

Members of the Legislative Assembly

Election results

History

Members of the Legislative Assembly – Melville

Members of the Legislative Assembly – Saltcoats (1905–1934)

Members of the Legislative Assembly – Saltcoats (1938–2003)

References

External links
Website of the Legislative Assembly of Saskatchewan
Saskatchewan Archives Board – Saskatchewan Election Results By Electoral Division

Melville, Saskatchewan
Saskatchewan provincial electoral districts